Marie Jeanne Frigard (1904 – unknown), née Stein, was a French chess master and classical violinist. She was four-times French Women's Chess Champion (1924, 1925, 1926, 1927). She was a first Women's World Chess Championship participant (1927).

Biography
In 1924, in Paris Marie Jeanne Frigard after play-off won first French Women's Chess Championship. Also Marie Jeanne Frigard three times repeated this success, moreover she two times took the second place in these tournaments, but became the champion, because the winner did not have French citizenship. In 1925 and 1927 such a chess player turned out to be Paulette Schwartzmann. In 1924, in Westende she ranked 2nd in International Women's amateur chess tournament. In 1927 she participated in the Women's World Chess Championship in London and shared 9th - 11th place (tournament won by Vera Menchik). After 1927 she rarely participated in chess tournaments.

Marie Jeanne Frigard has played violin from the age of seven. In 1920s and 1930s she was the famous classical violinist. In 1928, Marie Jeanne Frigard as the first violin of the Saint-Denis Orchestra took part in guest performances in Canada.

During the occupation of France Marie Jeanne Frigard lived in Nice, where she was deported in 1943 or 1944. There is a lack of news about her death.

References

External links
Marie Jeanne Frigard chess games at chessbase.com

1904 births
Year of death missing
Sportspeople from Var (department)
French female chess players
20th-century French women classical violinists
French Jews who died in the Holocaust